Dae-sung, also spelled Dae-seong, is a Korean masculine given name. Its meaning differs based on the hanja used to write each syllable of the name. There are 17 hanja with the reading "dae" and 27 hanja with the reading "sung" on the South Korean government's official list of hanja which may be registered for use in given names.

People
People with this name include:

Sportspeople
Lee Dae-Sung (born 1958), South Korean-born American taekwondo practitioner
Koo Dae-sung (born 1969), South Korean baseball player
Kim Dae-sung (born 1972), South Korean football midfielder
Kwak Dae-sung (born 1973), South Korean judo practitioner
Moon Dae-sung (born 1976), South Korean taekwondo practitioner
Kim Dae-sung (badminton) (born 1984), South Korean badminton player
Ha Dae-sung (born 1985), South Korean football midfielder
Moon Dae-seong (born 1986), South Korean football forward
Hwang Te-song (born 1989), Zainichi Korean football defender (J. League 2)
Jin Dae-sung (born 1989), South Korean football midfielder

Other
Kim Daeseong (700–774), Silla minister under King Seongdeok
Kang Daesung (born 1989), member of South Korean boy band Big Bang

See also
List of Korean given names

References

Korean masculine given names